Interstate 35E (I-35E), an Interstate Highway, is the eastern half of I-35, where it splits to serve the Dallas–Fort Worth metropolitan area. I-35 splits into two branch routes, I-35W and I-35E, at Hillsboro. It travels through Dallas before rejoining with I-35W to reform I-35 in Denton.

During the early years of the Interstate Highway System, branching Interstates with directional suffixes, such as N, S, E, and W, were common nationwide. On every other Interstate nationwide, these directional suffixes have been phased out by redesignating the suffixed route numbers with a loop or spur route number designation (such as I-270 in Maryland, which was once I-70S) or, in some cases, were assigned a different route number (such as I-76, which was once I-80S). In the case of I-35 in the Dallas–Fort Worth area, since neither branch is clearly the main route and both branches return to a unified Interstate beyond the cities of Dallas and Fort Worth, officials at the American Association of State Highway and Transportation Officials (AASHTO) have allowed the suffixes of E and W in Texas to remain in the present day. I-35 also splits into I-35E and I-35W in Minneapolis–Saint Paul, Minnesota, for similar reasons as the I-35 split in the Dallas–Fort Worth area. Additionally, Minnesota's I-35E also continues the I-35 exit numbers and mileposts like the Texas version does.

Route description

Concurrent routes

U.S. Highway 67
I-35E travels concurrently with U.S. Highway 67 (US 67) from just north of Kiest Boulevard in the Oak Cliff area of Dallas to the I-30 interchange in Downtown Dallas. From there, US 67 joins with I-30. On both segments, US 67 is unsigned.

U.S. Highway 77
From Waco, Texas, to El Dorado, Kansas, I-35 (or I-35E) typically runs concurrent with or lies fairly close to US 77. This highway travels parallel to I-35E after splitting off of I-35 north of Hillsboro, running through Italy and Milford. It joins with I-35E for less than  just south of Waxahachie before splitting back off to run through Waxahachie. It rejoins the Interstate just north of a junction with State Highway 342 (SH 342) in Red Oak. US 77 stays with the Interstate through Dallas and up to the southeastern section of Denton. It then breaks off, rejoining I-35 north of the city. Except for the spur sections (Denton and the section between Red Oak and Hillsboro) and the portion from I-635 to the split in Denton, US 77 is unsigned.

From the Dallas–Ellis county line to Denton

From the Dallas–Ellis county line to Downtown Dallas, I-35E is called South R.L. Thornton Freeway and varies from 8 to 10 lanes plus HOV. The section from I-20 to Downtown Dallas will be undergoing a major reconstruction by 2015 to 12 lanes. Reconstruction of I-35E and the downtown Mixmaster interchange with I-30 is planned as part of the Horseshoe Project, derived from the larger Pegasus Project. From this point, I-35E is named the Stemmons Freeway to Lewisville. This section will undergo reconstruction in three phases. The first, a widening of I-35E from I-635 to Denton, will start in late 2011 to over 16 lanes. The second, the LBJ Project, will include elevated toll I-35E lanes by 2016. Last is the major reconstruction of Stemmons Freeway (I-35E) from Downtown Dallas to I-635 to over 20 lanes by 2020.

History

I-35E replaced most of US 77 between Hillsboro and Denton. US 77 is unsigned along the route, with the exception of the highway that runs through Waxahachie–Red Oak and Denton. I-35E was completed in the early 1960s.

When first designated, I-35W and I-35E were the only "suffixed" highways in Texas. Subsequently, I-69W, I-69E, and I-69C have been designated.

Exit list
Exit numbers and mileposts increase numerically from the south end, continuing the numbers used on I-35.

Auxiliary routes
I-635, while technically a loop of I-35, only intersects I-35E and neither I-35 nor I-35W.

See also

References

External links

Interstate Guide: I-35E & I-35W (Texas)
I-35E south of downtown Dallas—from dfwfreeways.info
I-35E north of downtown Dallas—from dfwfreeways.info

35E
35E
E (Texas)
Transportation in Hill County, Texas
Transportation in Ellis County, Texas
Transportation in Dallas County, Texas
Transportation in Denton County, Texas